Lord Blantyre was a title in the Peerage of Scotland. It was created in 1606 for the politician Walter Stewart. The lordship was named for Blantyre Priory in Lanarkshire, where Walter Stewart had been commendator. The main residences associated with the Lords Blantyre were Erskine House (Renfrewshire), Lennoxlove House (East Lothian) and Place of Cardonald (Renfrewshire).

Upon the death of the 12th Lord Blantyre in 1900 the title became extinct, with the Blantyre estates passing to his grandson, William Arthur Baird.

Lords Blantyre (1606)
Walter Stewart, 1st Lord Blantyre (d. 8 March 1617), Scottish politician and judge
William Stewart, 2nd Lord Blantyre (d. 29 November 1638)
Walter Stewart, 3rd Lord Blantyre (d. October 1641)
Alexander Stewart, 4th Lord Blantyre (d. )
Alexander Stuart, 5th Lord Blantyre (d. 20 June 1704), Scottish soldier and politician 
Walter Stuart, 6th Lord Blantyre (1 February 1683 – 23 June 1713)
Robert Stuart, 7th Lord Blantyre (d. 17 November 1743)
Walter Stuart, 8th Lord Blantyre (d. 21 May 1751)
William Stuart, 9th Lord Blantyre (d. 16 January 1776), grandfather to H.H. Rajah Sir James Brooke, Rajah of Sarawak
Alexander Stuart, 10th Lord Blantyre (d. 5 November 1783)
Robert Walter Stuart, 11th Lord Blantyre (10 June 1777 – 22 September 1830)
Charles Stuart, 12th Lord Blantyre  (21 December 1818 – 15 December 1900), Scottish landlord

References and further reading
 J. Debrett Peerage of England, Scotland and Ireland (13th edn, 1820), p861

Extinct lordships of Parliament
Noble titles created in 1606
Blantyre, South Lanarkshire